The 2022 Joe McDonagh Cup is the fifth staging of the Joe McDonagh Cup since its establishment by the Gaelic Athletic Association in 2018. The fixtures were published in December 2021.

Westmeath, winner of the 2021 final, were promoted to the Leinster Senior Hurling Championship, replaced by Antrim who were relegated back to this competition. Offaly were promoted from the Christy Ring Cup.

The top 2 teams from the round robin stage will play off in the final to decide the winner. Both will advance to the 2022 All-Ireland Senior Hurling Championship knock-out stages. The bottom team will be relegated to Christy Ring Cup.

Team changes

To Championship 
Relegated from the All-Ireland Senior Hurling Championship

 Antrim

Promoted from the Christy Ring Cup

 Offaly

From Championship 
Promoted to the All-Ireland Senior Hurling Championship

 Westmeath

Relegated to the Christy Ring Cup

 Kildare

Team information

Personnel and general information

Group stage

Round 1

Round 2

Round 3

Round 4

Round 5

Final 

Antrim qualify for the 2023 All-Ireland Senior Hurling Championship and are promoted to the 2023 Leinster Senior Hurling Championship, replacing Laois.

Statistics

Top scorers

Top scorer overall

In a single game

Scoring events 

 Widest winning margin: 30 points
 Kerry 6-25 - 0-13 Meath (round 3)
 Most goals in a match: 10
Meath 3-13 - 7-29 Antrim (round 4)
 Most points in a match: 51
Kerry 2-28 - 4-23 Offaly (round 4)
 Most goals by one team in a match: 7
Meath 3-13 - 7-29 Antrim (round 4)
 Most points by one team in a match: 30
Meath 0-17 - 4-30 Carlow (round 1)
 Highest aggregate score: 73 points
Antrim 5-22 - 4-24 Kerry (final)
 Lowest aggregate score: 39 points
Offaly 0-17 - 0-22 Carlow (round 5)

Miscellaneous

Antrim won their 2st championship in 3 years.
 Antrim become the first team to win the Joe McDonagh Cup twice.
 Kerry become the first team to contest 3 Joe McDonagh Cup finals in a row and also lose 3 finals in a row.
 Meath become the first team to be relegated from the Joe McDonagh Cup twice.
 Meath holds the record for most goals conceded (21) and most points conceded (197) in a single Joe McDonagh Cup campaign.
 First-time Joe McDonagh Cup meetings:
 Offaly v Meath (Round 2)
 Down v Antrim (Round 2)
 Down v Offaly (Round 3)
 Carlow v Down (Round 4)
 Offaly v Carlow (Round 5)

References 

Joe McDonagh Cup
Joe McDonagh Cup